The 2015 Golden Spin of Zagreb was the 48th edition of the annual senior-level international figure skating competition held in Zagreb, Croatia. It was held at the Dom sportova on December 2015 as part of the 2015–16 ISU Challenger Series. Medals were awarded in the disciplines of men's singles, ladies' singles, pair skating, and ice dancing.

Entries
The preliminary entries were published on 16 November 2015.

Results

Men

Ladies

Pairs

Ice dancing

References

External links
 
 Results
 2015 Golden Spin of Zagreb at the International Skating Union

Golden Spin of Zagreb, 2015
Golden Spin of Zagreb
Golden Spin of Zagreb